Dwight Edward Aultman (February 2, 1872 – December 12, 1929) was an American army officer and brigadier general who served during World War I.

Early life 
Aultman was born in Allegheny, Pennsylvania. In 1894, he graduated number fourteen of fifty-four from the United States Military Academy.

Career 

After graduation, he was commissioned a second lieutenant in the Fourth Cavalry.

During the Spanish–American War, Aultman was a part of the Battle of San Juan Hill in 1898, as well as the Siege of Santiago in Cuba. From December 1898 to January 1899, he was aide to General Lloyd Wheaton and later General Joseph Warren Keifer. From 1901 to 1906, Aultman organized, commanded, and instructed the Cuban artillery.

From 1907 to 1911, he was an instructor at the department of languages of the service schools, and from 1914–1915 he was on special mission to Germany. Aultman retired as an instructor and graduated from the Army War College in 1916. In 1917 he wrote a book entitled Military Strength and Resources of the United States. From October 1917 to May 1918, Aultman commanded the Fifth Field Artillery Brigade, First Infantry Division. On April 18, 1918 he was promoted to brigadier general of the National Army and later commanded the 51st Field Artillery Brigade, 26th Division. He was appointed Chief of Artillery, Fifth Corps, in October 1918.

On April 27, 1921, he was again promoted to brigadier general.

Awards 
Aultman received the Army Distinguished Service Medal from the United States, the citation for which reads:

In addition, he also received the Croix de Guerre as well as the commander of the Legion of Honor from France. Aultman also received a Silver Star for gallantry in action during the Santiago de Cuba Campaign, 22 June to 17 July 1898.

Death and legacy 
Dwight Edward Aultman died at the age of fifty-seven on December 2, 1929. Aultman and his wife Alma are buried at Arlington National Cemetery.

References

Bibliography

 Davis, Henry Blaine. Generals in Khaki. Raleigh, NC: Pentland Press, 1998. , 
 Marquis Who's Who, Inc. Who Was Who in American History, the Military. Chicago: Marquis Who's Who, 1975. , 

1872 births
1929 deaths
United States Military Academy alumni
United States Army generals of World War I
Burials at Arlington National Cemetery
Military personnel from Pennsylvania
United States Army generals
American military personnel of the Spanish–American War
Recipients of the Silver Star
Recipients of the Distinguished Service Medal (US Army)
Recipients of the Croix de Guerre 1914–1918 (France)
Commandeurs of the Légion d'honneur
United States Army War College alumni
United States Army Cavalry Branch personnel